Hugh McMillan (December 19, 1839 – October 31, 1895) was a Quebec businessman and political figure.  He represented Vaudreuil in the House of Commons of Canada as a Conservative member from 1883 to 1891 and from 1892 to 1893.

McMillan was born in Rigaud, Lower Canada, the son of Donald McMillan and Olympe Mongenais.  He served on the county council and was a captain in the local militia.  In 1862, he married Agnes Mongenais, the daughter of Jean-Baptiste Mongenais, who was then representing Vaudreuil in the Legislative Assembly of the Province of Canada.  From 1865 to 1873, McMillan ran the grain and feed business established by his father at Rigaud, later building and operating a sawmill there. He died in Rigaud at the age of 55.

Electoral record

References 

1839 births
1895 deaths
Conservative Party of Canada (1867–1942) MPs
Members of the House of Commons of Canada from Quebec
Anglophone Quebec people